Oleksandrivka, (is an urban-type settlement in Kropyvnytskyi Raion of Kirovohrad Oblast in Ukraine. It is located on the Tiasmyn, a right tributary of the Dnieper. Oleksandrivka hosts the administration of Oleksandrivka settlement hromada, one of the hromadas of Ukraine. As of 2022, it had an estimated population of 

Until 18 July 2020, Oleksandrivka was the administrative center of Oleksandrivka Raion. The raion was abolished in July 2020 as part of the administrative reform of Ukraine, which reduced the number of raions of Kirovohrad Oblast to four. The area of Oleksandrivka Raion was merged into Kropyvnytskyi Raion.

Economy

Transportation
The settlement is the branching point of Highway H01 connecting Kyiv and Znamianka, and Highway H14 which runs via Kropyvnytskyi to Mykolaiv.

Fundukliivka railway station, located in Oleksandrivka, is on the railway connecting Kyiv and Znamianka with further access to Kropyvnytskyi, Kremenchuk, and Mykolaiv. There is passenger traffic, both local and long-distance.

References

Urban-type settlements in Kropyvnytskyi Raion